The 2021–22 Sacred Heart Pioneers men's ice hockey season was the 29th season of play for the program, the 24th at the Division I level, and the 19th season in the Atlantic Hockey conference. The Pioneers represented Sacred Heart University and were coached by C. J. Marottolo, in his 13th season.

Season
Sacred Heart spent the entire season hovering around the .500 mark. The team was effectively average in all aspects of the game; neither their offense nor defense were particularly strong, but both couldn't be called weaknesses either. Over the course of the season, Sacred Heart's longest losing streak was just three games but they weren't able to put together any long stretches of winning hockey. The Pioneers got mostly reliable goaltending from junior Justin Robbins but also buoyed his efforts with stints from both Josh Benson and Luke Lush.

Probably the best performance from the team came in the Connecticut Ice semifinal when they lost to #2 Quinnipiac into overtime. The Pioneers had led late, only to see the Bobcats tie the score after pulling their goalie.

The Pioneers' 5th-place finish in Atlantic Hockey earned them an automatic bid into the conference quarterfinals. Despite outplaying RIT for a majority of the three-game series, Sacred Heart's offense was lacking and scored just once in their two losses.

Departures

Recruiting

Roster
.

Standings

Schedule and results

|-
!colspan=12 style=";" | Regular Season

|-
!colspan=12 ! style=""; | 

|-
!colspan=12 style=";" | 

|- align="center" bgcolor="#e0e0e0"
|colspan=12|Sacred Heart Lost Series 1–2

Scoring statistics

Goaltending statistics

Rankings

Note: USCHO did not release a poll in week 24.

Awards and honors

References

2021-22
2021–22 Atlantic Hockey men's ice hockey season
2021–22 NCAA Division I men's ice hockey by team
2021 in sports in Connecticut
2022 in sports in Connecticut